Un Kannil Neer Vazhinthal... is a 1985 Indian Tamil-language action film written and directed by Balu Mahendra. It stars Rajinikanth and Madhavi, with Y. G. Mahendran in a prominent role. V. K. Ramasamy and Senthamarai play other pivotal roles. The film, released on 20 June 1985, was an average grosser at the box office and had a theatrical run of 75 days.

Plot 

Ravi is a police officer who falls in love with Padma. All goes well, until a criminal police officer Dharmaraj frames Ravi. His friend Babu is killed and the blame falls on Ravi, so he is suspended from the job. How he discovers Dharmaraj's true identity and how he tries to prove his innocence forms the rest of the story.

Cast 
Rajinikanth as Ravi
Madhavi as Padma
Y. G. Mahendran as Babu
Senthamarai as Dharmaraj
V. K. Ramasamy as Perumal
Vennira Aadai Moorthy
Menon as Jagathy
Master Haja Sheriff
Poornam Viswanathan as Viswanath
Oru Viral Krishna Rao as Munusami
Sangeeta as Durga
Mounika as Viswanath's daughter

Production 
Mounika made her feature film debut in this film. It is the only time Rajinikanth acted under Balu Mahendra's direction. The film was largely shot in Ooty. It is one of the few films directed by Mahendra to be outright "mainstream", alongside Neengal Kettavai (1984).

Soundtrack 
The soundtrack was composed by Ilaiyaraaja, with lyrics by Gangai Amaran, Mu. Metha and Vairamuthu.

Reception 
Jayamanmadhan of Kalki said the film, despite numerous flaws, could be watched for its outdoor photography.

References

External links 

1980s Tamil-language films
1985 films
Fictional portrayals of the Tamil Nadu Police
Films directed by Balu Mahendra
Films scored by Ilaiyaraaja
Films shot in Ooty